The 64th Infantry Division (64. Infanterie-Division) was a infantry division of the Wehrmacht during World War II.

History 
The division was formed sometime before August 1944 in Cologne.  It saw action at Battle of Abbeville and was isolated when the 15th Army left by Scheldt.  Because of the division's commander, Major General Knut Eberding, to stay behind and fight the 2nd Canadian Corps resulting in the Breskens Pocket.  Because of the battle the main army was able to organize the Ardennes Offensive.

Organization 
Organization of the Division:

 1037th Grenadier Regiment
 1038th Grenadier Regiment
 1059th Grenadier Regiment
 164th Artillery Regiment
 64th Fusilier Battalion
 164th Tank Destroyer Company
 164th Engineer Battalion
 164th Signal Battalion
 164th Divisional Supply Group

References 

Wehrmacht